Allan Armstrong Swenson (born December 26, 1933) is an author, literary agent and master gardener. He  worked for over 25 years as a nationally syndicated newspaper columnist and radio-TV personality, and is the author of more than 50 books.

Early life
Swenson was born in Clifton, New Jersey, to Harold Oscar and Amy Tudor Dugdale Swenson.  
As a boy, he was a very active member of the 4-H Club. Swenson earned his Phi Beta Kappa Key at Rutgers University, where he received a BA degree in Journalism.

Career
Following graduation, Swenson became a radio and television writer at WNBC in New York for the Phil Alampi shows.

Swenson was recruited into Army Intelligence while a Cadet Colonel of the Army ROTC at Rutgers University. He served as an Intelligence Officer, holding the rank of captain, during active duty with the 525 MI Group and with the XVIII Airborne Corps during the 1950s. From this background, Swenson wrote his Guide to the CIA and Guide to National Security.

After leaving the military, Swenson became a writer in New York City, working as a copywriter and an account executive for the advertising agencies Albert Sidney Noble and Dancer-Fitzgerald-Sample. Swenson formed his own Public Relations Agency in NYC in the 1960s, serving clients including American Cyanamid, Topper Toys, Eastern Airlines, and Shell Chemical.

During this time, and for more than 25 years, Swenson wrote a gardening column for NEA-United Media which appeared in more than 200 papers nationwide.

Swenson founded Camp America and created its nationwide Fly In-Camp Out program. With outfitters in major cities, his organization enabled families to fly from their home areas, rent van campers or motor homes and explore outdoor America. He later sold the organization to Winnebago Industries.

Based on his ongoing gardening columns, Swenson became an author and wrote more than 50 books published by Doubleday, Random House, McMillan, Penguin and other publishers. His series of Plants of the Bible, Herbs of the Bible and Foods Jesus Ate led to his periodic appearance on television programs, including the 700 Club. He also wrote the Inflation Fighter’s Victory Garden; Inflation Fighters Preserving Guide; Plan Your Own Landscape; Landscape You Can Eat; and dozens of specialty garden books.  He also wrote the L.L. Bean Canoeing Handbook, which is held by more than 400 libraries around the world.

For young readers, Swenson wrote a book series including World Beneath Your Feet, World Above Your Head and World In A Tidal Pool. Under his pen name for children’s books, Virginia Langley, he authored Hurray for Christopher Cat about a Maine Coon cat, Thar She Blows about a whale-watching trip, Babes in the Woods about baby animals and their habitats, and several others.

Over the years, Swenson appeared on various network TV shows about his books, including appearing as Dr. Plant on the syndicated Good Day Show and as the Good Growing Guy on Good Morning America. He then created his own Gardener’s Notebook TV series for syndication. Before moving to Maine with his family in 1974, Swenson had his own radio show on 400 stations of the Mutual Radio Network from New York City which also was carried by independent stations.

After moving to Maine, Swenson created a Book Division for the Gannett Publishing Company. Among the authors of the eighty books he published during his ten-year tenure as Editor-in-Chief were Bill Caldwell and Marjorie Standish.

Swenson wrote extensively for, and attended, the Leif Ericson Millennium in 2000 in Greenland. Following this, he wrote many articles about Norse history for a wide range of Scandinavian-America publications. In recognition of his work honoring early Scandinavian culture, Swenson was honored by the king and queen of Denmark.

At the age of 70, Swenson, with his wife Sheila, began speaking and giving slide shows on cruise ships of Royal Caribbean, Celebrity, Norwegian, and Princess Cruise Lines about his books as well as about ports of call in the Caribbean, Baltic and other areas. Later they gave presentations about their travels to residents at senior centers and retirement facilities in Maine and New Hampshire.

Associations
Swenson is a member of the Overseas Press Club, affiliated with the National Press Club and Deadline Club.  He also was a long time member of the Garden Writers Association.  He helped found both the New England and Maine Chapters of the Association of Former Intelligence Officers.

Personal life
Swenson and his wife Sheila raised four boys: Peter, Drew, Boyd and Meade who all live nearby in Maine with their families.

Bibliography 

Swenson, Allan A  The Ships, Sagas, and Explorations of the Vikings   Skyhorse (September 13, 2014) 
Swenson, Allan A  Foods Jesus Ate and How to Grow Them  Skyhorse (February 15, 2011)
Swenson, Allan A  Great Growing at Home  Taylor Trade(January 28, 2008)  
Swenson, Allan A  Praising the Gifts of God  Citadel (September 1, 2005)   
Swenson, Allan A  Herbs of the Bible  Citadel (May 1, 2003)  Illustrations by Peter Jon Swenson
Swenson, Allan A  The Everything Landscaping Book  Adams Media Corporation (March 2003) 
Swenson, Allan A  The Everything Gardening Book  Adams Media Corporation (March 2003)  
Benson, Michael; Coulson, Daniel O and Swenson, Allan  The Complete Idiot's Guide to National Security Alpha (October 7, 2003)  
Swenson, Allan A  Flowers of the Bible: And How to Grow Them  Citadel (October 1, 2002)   
Swenson Allan and Benson Michael  The Complete Idiot's Guide to the CIA  Alpha (August 1, 2002)I  
Swenson, Allan A  L.L.Bean Canoeing Handbook  Lyons (July 1, 2000)  
Swenson, Allan; Swenson, Boyd and Fink, Kathy  Rural York County, ME  Arcadia (June 6, 1995)  
Swenson, Allan A  Plants of the Bible: And How to Grow Them  Citadel (June 1, 2000) 
Swenson, Allan A  The Gardener's Book of Berries  Lyons (February 1, 1994) 
Swenson, Allan A  Fruit Trees for the Home Gardener  Lyons (October 1, 1994)  
Swenson, Allan A  Your Biblical Garden: Plants of the Bible and How to Grow Them  Doubleday (January 1981)  
Swenson, Allan A  Bush country by George!  Gannett (1981) 
Swenson, Allan A  Secrets of a Seashore  Gannett (June 1981)  
Swenson, Allan A  Wood Heat  Fawcett (January 12, 1980) ISBN 978 -0449142486 
Swenson, Allan A  The world within the tidal pool  McKay (1979) 
Swenson, Allan A  100 Oldtime Roses for Gardens of Today  McKay (1979) 
Swenson, Allan A  The world beneath your feet: Animals that live underground  McKay (1978) 5  
Swenson, Allan A  Plan Your Own Landscape  Grosset & Dunlap (1978) 
Swenson, Allan A  The Gardener's Almanac  Grosset & Dunlap (1978) 
Swenson, Allan A  The world above your head: Animals that live in trees, barns, and on cliffs  McKay (1978) 
Swenson, Allan A  Starting over: How to recharge your life-style and career A & W  Publishers (1978) 
Swenson, Allan A  Landscape You Can Eat  McKay (1977) 
Swenson, Allan A  Allan A Swenson's Big fun to grow book  McKay (1977)
Swenson, Allan A  Cultivating Carnivorous Plants  Book World (December 1976)  
Swenson, Allan A  My Own Herb Garden  Rodale Pr (November 1976) 
Swenson, Allan A  The Inflation Fighter's Victory Garden  Ballantine Books (February 12, 1975) 
Swenson, Allan A  Terrariums  Fawcett (1975) 
Swenson, Allan A  The practical book of organic gardening  Award Books (1973)

References

External links
Allan A. Swenson on WorldCat

1933 births
Living people
People from New Jersey
American garden writers
Rutgers University alumni